Dina Blagojević (born 15 March 1997) is a Serbian footballer who plays as a midfielder for Bayer Leverkusen in the German Frauen Bundesliga and has appeared for the Serbia women's national team.

Career
Blagojević has been capped for the Serbia national team, appearing for the team during the 2019 FIFA Women's World Cup qualifying cycle.

International goals

References

External links
 
 
 

1997 births
Living people
Serbian women's footballers
Serbia women's international footballers
Serbian expatriate sportspeople in Germany
Expatriate sportspeople in Germany
Women's association football midfielders
SC Sand players
Frauen-Bundesliga players
ŽFK Crvena zvezda players